TF3 may refer to:

 Theaflavin digallate
 The promotional abbreviation for Transformers: Dark of the Moon, the third live-action Transformers film
 Time for Three string trio
 SS Train Ferry No. 3